Le Saix is a commune in the Hautes-Alpes department in southeastern France.

History
Circa 2500 BCE, humans settled on the banks of the river valley that is a northern tributary of the River Maraize on the Saix proper, as evidenced by bits of blades, sickles, arrowheads, scrapers and shards of flint. Using such evidence as a jumping-off point, French archaeologists have chronicled the development of human culture in the immediate area; among the discovered items have been polished Stone Age axes and Celtic hatchets, bracelets and necklaces of pearls and amber, as well as many relatively sophisticated tools indicative of the arrival of the Bronze Age. Flat tiles, as well as fragments of pottery and coins dating back to the times of Maximinus Thrax provide evidence of the town's possible Roman origins.

Population

See also
Communes of the Hautes-Alpes department

References

Communes of Hautes-Alpes